Ahghuk (also Romanized as Āhghūk, Āhchūk, and Ah Chūk) is a village in Korond Rural District, in the Central District of Boshruyeh County, South Khorasan Province, Iran. At the 2006 census, its population was 17, in 4 families.

References 

Populated places in Boshruyeh County